is a Hiroden station (tram stop) on Hiroden Main Line, located in Ebisu-cho, Naka-ku, Hiroshima.

Routes
From Ebisu-cho Station, there are three of Hiroden Streetcar routes.

 Hiroshima Station - Hiroshima Port Route
 Hiroshima Station - Hiroden-miyajima-guchi Route
 Hiroshima Station - Eba Route

Connections
█ Main Line
  
Kanayama-cho — Ebisu-cho — Hatchobori

Around station
Mitsukoshi Hiroshima
Tenmaya Hiroshima

History
Opened as "Kami-nagarekawa-cho" on November 23, 1912.
Renamed to "Nagarekawa-cho" in 1927.
Renamed to the present name "Ebisu-cho" on April 1, 1965.

References

See also

Hiroden Streetcar Lines and Routes

Ebisu-cho Station
Railway stations in Japan opened in 1912